My Little Pony: Equestria Girls – Friendship Games, known simply as Friendship Games, is a 2015 flash animated musical sports fantasy television movie sequel to 2014's My Little Pony: Equestria Girls – Rainbow Rocks, directed by Ishi Rudell and written by Josh Haber, It was produced by DHX Media's 2D animation studio in Vancouver, Canada for Hasbro Studios in the United States, as part of Hasbro's Equestria Girls toy line and media franchise, itself a spin-off of the 2010 relaunch of My Little Pony. The movie received a television network premiere on Discovery Family, a joint venture between Discovery Communications and Hasbro, on September 26, 2015, with a home media release on October 13 that year; it also had a limited theatrical run in the United Kingdom and Australia beginning in late October 2015.

Like the first two Equestria Girls movies, Friendship Games re-envisions the main characters of the parent franchise, normally ponies, as teenage human characters in a high school setting. The movie's story centers around a sports competition between the students of Canterlot High School and their rivals at Crystal Prep Academy, one of whom is Twilight's human counterpart, who has been investigating the magical activity around Canterlot High.

A fourth Equestria Girls movie, subtitled Legend of Everfree, was released on Netflix on October 1, 2016.

Plot 

The students of Canterlot High School prepare for the Friendship Games, an academic and sporting competition held every four years between their school's team, the Wondercolts, and the undefeated Shadowbolts from Crystal Prep Academy. Sunset Shimmer, who has been observing her friends' magical ability to "pony up" – grow pony-like ears, tails, and wings – whenever they play musical instruments, becomes concerned when Rainbow Dash transforms during a pep rally, seemingly at random. Tasked with finding the cause of this development, Sunset attempts to contact Twilight for advice but receives no response.

Meanwhile, one of Crystal Prep's students, Twilight's human counterpart, investigates the magical activity surrounding Canterlot High. Twilight builds a locket-like device to detect and contain the magic for further study, hoping this will secure her application for Everton, a coveted independent study program. However, Principal Cinch threatens to revoke the application to blackmail Twilight into participating in the Friendship Games and maintain Crystal Prep's victory record.

Upon Twilight's arrival at Canterlot High, her device detects Sunset and her friends' magic and leads Twilight to them; as she approaches, the device inadvertently drains Rarity's magic when she "ponies up" after making uniforms for the other girls. Sunset, initially mistaking Twilight for her pony counterpart, quickly realizes the misunderstanding and considers consulting Twilight in person. When Crystal Prep's Twilight follows her to the portal to Equestria, the device absorbs the portal's magic and seals it off. The device similarly affects Pinkie Pie when she tries to ease the tension with a party and later Fluttershy when she attempts to cheer up a distraught Twilight, creating dimensional rifts to Equestria and giving Twilight's dog Spike the ability to speak.

Following Twilight's victory in the games' academic decathlon, the games continue with a "tri cross relay", a relay race between archery, speed skating and motocross. Applejack transforms after she advises Twilight, causing the device to steal Applejack's magic and create a rift that summons monstrous plants. Rainbow Dash "ponies up" to save the other competitors before losing her magic, allowing Canterlot High to win the event, but causing Cinch to accuse Canterlot High of cheating due to their perceived magical advantage. Frustrated by her failure to keep the magic protected, Sunset furiously berates Twilight for endangering her friends, regretting it when Twilight runs off in tears.

Before the final event, Cinch and the Shadowbolts pressure Twilight into releasing the magic within her device to harness it against the Wondercolts. The magic instead corrupts Twilight, turning her into a winged monster who proceeds to destroy the statue portal and open more rifts that threaten to destroy the parallel world. As the Wondercolts and Shadowbolts work together to save their classmates, Sunset notices her friends' magical auras and realizes that their magic manifests when they exhibit the same traits as the Elements of Harmony. Gathering their magic with the device, Sunset assumes an angelic form resembling Princess Celestia, closes the rifts, and returns Twilight to normal.

Refusing to relent from manipulating Twilight, Cinch threatens to report the incident to the school board. When taunted that no one would believe her account of the magical incidents, however, she concedes to a tie that is celebrated by both teams. Reconsidering her Everton application, Twilight realizes she is happier at Canterlot High and transfers there, where Sunset and the other students welcome her as a new friend.

In a pre-credits scene, the Twilight from Equestria emerges from the portal with the counterparts of her friends gathered around it. She apologizes for her absence, explaining that she has just escaped from a time travel loop, before gawking at the sight of her counterpart.

Cast 

 Tara Strong as Twilight Sparkle, the socially awkward prized student of Crystal Prep Academy (later Canterlot High School) and a member of the Shadowbolts (later the Wondercolts). Strong also voices her counterpart from Equestria in a pre-credits scene.
 Rebecca Shoichet as Sunset Shimmer, a Canterlot High School student/Wondercolt who hails as a unicorn from Equestria. Shoichet also performs Twilight Sparkle's singing voice.
 Ashleigh Ball as Rainbow Dash, a competitive athlete/Wondercolt and Applejack, an honest country girl/Wondercolt.
 Andrea Libman as Pinkie Pie, a cheerful, party-obsessed Wondercolt and Fluttershy, a kindhearted Wondercolt/animal lover; and Sweetie Drops, a Wondercolt.
 Tabitha St. Germain as Rarity, a dressmaker Wondercolt with a generous spirit and Vice Principal Luna, Celestia's younger sister. Kazumi Evans performs Rarity's singing voice.
 Cathy Weseluck as Spike, Twilight's pet dog who gains the ability to speak after exposure to Equestrian magic.
 Frank Welker does Spike's barking and growling sounds.
 Iris Quinn as Principal Abacus Cinch, the reputation-obsessed head of Crystal Prep Academy.
 Sharon Alexander as Sour Sweet, a Shadowbolt who alternates between an obnoxiously nice and ill-tempered personality.
 Sienna Bohn as Sugarcoat, a Shadowbolt who bluntly speaks her mind.
 Kelly Sheridan as Indigo Zap, a hypercompetitive Shadowbolt.
 Britt Irvin as Sunny Flare, a disdainful Shadowbolt.
Shannon Chan-Kent as Lemon Zest, a Shadowbolt and rock music enthusiast. Chan-Kent also performs Pinkie Pie's singing voice.
 Nicole Oliver as Principal Celestia, the head of Canterlot High School.
 Britt McKillip as Dean Cadance, the friendly dean of Crystal Prep Academy.
 Vincent Tong as Flash Sentry, a Wondercolt who is enamored with Twilight's counterpart in Equestria; and an unnamed Crystal Prep bus driver.
 Andrew Francis as Shining Armor, a Crystal Prep alumnus, and Twilight's older brother.

Production 
A forest clearing, used both for the Friendship Is Magic episode "Bloom & Gloom" and for this movie, was previewed in a background image shown online back in November 2014.

The third installment was first teased by Rainbow Rocks co-director, Ishi Rudell on December 12, 2014. Brony Donald "Dusty Katt" Rhoades asked wondering about Rudell's silence on Twitter, and Rudell replied that he was "too busy working on #3".

On January 29, 2015, Australian home media distributor Beyond International stated via Facebook that they had obtained distribution rights for seasons 4 and 5 of Friendship Is Magic, in addition to Rainbow Rocks and the "third Equestria Girls (film)". Further confirmation was given during Hasbro's investor presentation at the 2015 New York Toy Fair, along with other products in the Friendship Games lineup.

The concept designs for the movie's ending credits were done by Katrina Hadley with Chris Lienonin and Jeremy Mah on the layouts.

This was also the first movie in the Equestria Girls spinoff franchise not to be directed by Jayson Thiessen and written by Meghan McCarthy (as well as the only one not to involve McCarthy in any way) as they were both busy directing and writing 2017 theatrical My Little Pony movie respectively, which was in production at the time, although Thiessen did direct the movie's companion shorts and was consulting director on the movie itself.

Music 

Like the previous two installments, the songs were composed by Daniel Ingram with lyric writing shared between Ingram and screenwriter Josh Haber; except "Friendship Games", "ACADECA" and "Right There in Front of Me" which had lyrics solely by Ingram. Even though it wasn't listed in Discovery Family's televised broadcast of the movie's ending credits, "What More Is Out There?" can be heard in the movie. Although "Right There in Front of Me" is listed in the credits, it is absent in Discovery Family's broadcast. Song production was done by Caleb Chan with vocal arrangements by Trevor Hoffman.
 "Friendship Games" – Sunset Shimmer, Applejack, Fluttershy, Pinkie Pie, Rainbow Dash, Rarity, and ensemble (voiceover)
 "CHS Rally Song" – Rainbow Dash and full company
 "What More Is Out There?" – Twilight Sparkle
 "ACADECA" (Academic Decathlon) – Twilight Sparkle, Sunset Shimmer, and full company (voiceover)
 "Unleash the Magic" – Principal Abacus Cinch, Twilight Sparkle, and the students of Crystal Prep Academy
 "End Credits Song: Right There in Front of Me" – Twilight Sparkle, Sunset Shimmer, Applejack, Fluttershy, Pinkie Pie, Rainbow Dash, Rarity, and ensemble (voiceover)

"Right There in Front of Me" plays over the closing credits on the movie's DVD and Blu-ray versions. According to Rudell, the song "Dance Magic" is unrelated to the movie.

One of the deleted scenes included in the Blu-ray and DVD set is an alternate version of the song "What More Is Out There?", featuring both Crystal Prep's Twilight Sparkle and Canterlot High's Sunset Shimmer. The song was originally intended as a duet for the two characters, but due to time constraints and the removal of a subplot involving Sunset questioning if she belonged to the human world or Equestria, it was ultimately rewritten as a solo for Twilight.

Release

Theatrical 
The movie received a theatrical debut exclusively at the Angelika Film Center in New York City on September 17, 2015. William Anderson, Ashleigh Ball, G.M. Berrow, Josh Haber, Daniel Ingram, Brian Lenard, Andrea Libman, Ishi Rudell, Rebecca Shoichet, Tara Strong and Cathy Weseluck, including Sarah Michelle Gellar from Buffy the Vampire Slayer and comedian Jim Gaffigan, were among those in attendance. Also in attendance was The Real Housewives of New York star Kristen Taekman, Top Chef's Padma Lakshmi, America's Got Talent host Nick Cannon, former New York Giants running back Tiki Barber, fashion photographer Nigel Barker, Sons of Anarchy's Drea de Matteo, and fitness guru Tracy Anderson.

Friendship Games had a limited theatrical release in select Vue Cinemas theaters in the United Kingdom between October 24, and November 1, 2015. The movie had a limited theatrical release at various Hoyts theaters in Australia between October 31, and November 10, 2015. In Mexico Cinépolis had a limited theatrical release between October 9 and 18, 2015.

Television 
In the United States, the movie was premiered on Discovery Family (a joint venture between Discovery Communications and Hasbro) on September 26, 2015. On December 24 (Christmas Eve), 2015, the movie made its debut in the United Kingdom on Pop.

Home media and streaming 
In the United States and Canada, Shout! Factory released Friendship Games on DVD (Region 1), Blu-ray disc, digital download release, and in a box set alongside its two predecessors on October 13, 2015. DVD and Blu-ray special features consist of four storyboard animatic deleted scenes, audio commentary, sing-alongs, and five animated shorts. Primal Screen released a Region 2 DVD on November 2, 2015, and includes the five animated shorts and a recap of the first two Equestria Girls movies.

On November 30, 2015, the My Little Pony Facebook page posted an advertisement promoting that the movie will be added to Netflix on December 1, 2015. The version used on Netflix is the same as the one found on the DVD and Blu-ray versions of the movie with the end credits song, "Right There in Front of Me", playing over the movie's end credits.

Merchandise and other media 

The movie is a part of the sport-themed Friendship Games lineup, a third installment in the My Little Pony: Equestria Girls toy line and media franchise, which was first displayed at London's 2015 Toy Fair in January, and mentioned with other supporting products, alongside this movie, during Hasbro's investor presentation in February that year. LB Kids published a novelization of the movie.

Animated shorts 
A series of animated prequel shorts for Friendship Games, similar to those produced for Rainbow Rocks, was announced on February 13, 2015. On July 31, 2015, the My Little Pony Facebook page posted some instructions for playing in the "Friendship Games Fantasy League" and indicated that a new short would be released every Saturday during August 2015. Like the Rainbow Rocks shorts, these are also separate from the movie. A total of five shorts were released; the first four of these, paired with a 10-minute preview of the movie, aired on Discovery Family on August 29, 2015.

Apart from the shorts above, a Friendship Games "blooper reel" was posted on the official Equestria Girls website on May 3, 2016, containing fictional outtakes of various scenes from the movie.

Soundtrack 
The movie's soundtrack was released on September 17, 2015 on iTunes and on Amazon on September 18, 2015. The first three singles, "Friendship Through the Ages", "My Past is Not Today" and "Life Is a Runway", were first released by Hasbro's YouTube channel on March 31, 2015; later re-uploaded on April 2, 2015.

Reception

Television viewership 
When the movie premiered on Discovery Family on September 26, 2015, it was viewed by 436,000 viewers. According to the Nielsen ratings, it was watched by approximately 120,000 adults 18-49.

Critical response 
The movie received mixed-to-positive reviews from critics. Daniel Alvarez of Unleash the Fanboy gave the movie a score of 8 out of 10, calling it "another quality installment in the Equestria Girls series." He praised the movie's characters, calling Sunset Shimmer "a great focus", as well as the movie's songs and "epic climax." However, he noted that several negatives "hold it back from being near perfect", such as Principal Cinch, whom he called "the worst antagonist." Geekscape'''s Adam Lemuz praised the movie as "a great follow-up to Rainbow Rocks." He further complimented that "fans of the previous films will get a lot of enjoyment out of it as it delivers plenty of solid laughs and noteworthy songs." Ed Liu of Toon Zone called the movie "solid addition to the Equestria Girls franchise", but felt it was "overly familiar" and "a little padded" when comparing it to the first movie's story. He also praised Sunset Shimmer's development from "a vintage mean girl to a strong, assertive character in her own right", calling her character arc initiated from the first movie "a wonderful long-form story". Mike Cahill of The Guardian'' gave the movie two out of five stars, calling it "craven commercialism", but adding that "it's not unattractively designed, and its peppy collegiate spirit trumps the sappiness of Disney's Tinkerbell spin-offs".

Notes

References

External links 

 

My Little Pony: Equestria Girls
English-language Canadian films
2015 computer-animated films
2015 television films
2015 films
2010s musical comedy films
2010s American animated films
2010s children's comedy films
2010s musical fantasy films
American children's animated adventure films
American children's animated comedy films
American children's animated fantasy films
American children's animated musical films
American fantasy adventure films
American flash animated films
American musical comedy films
American sequel films
American television films
Canadian animated feature films
Canadian animated fantasy films
Canadian children's fantasy films
Canadian musical fantasy films
Canadian sequel films
Equestria Girls films
2010s fantasy adventure films
Film spin-offs
Films about shapeshifting
Hasbro Studios films
American musical fantasy films
DHX Media films
Demons in film
Magical girl films
2010s English-language films
2010s Canadian films